The Toyota-Otis Sparks were a basketball team in the Philippine Basketball League from 2004 until the league became dormant after 2010. The team was owned by Toyota Otis, Inc., a Toyota automotive dealership based in Manila.

Current roster

Former coaches and players
 Louie Alas (2004-2006, coach)
 Mark Andaya
 Joe Devance
 Johnathan Aldave
 Boyet Bautista
 Ronjay Enrile

Former Philippine Basketball League teams